Baltimore and Ohio Class S comprised three  classes of 2-10-2 locomotives. 

The S class proper were 31 locomotives built in 1914 by Baldwin Locomotive Works and numbered 6000–6030. The S-1 class comprised 50 locomotives numbered 6100–6149, and 25 locomotives numbered 6150-6174. They were built between 1923 and 1924, 75 by Baldwin and by Lima Locomotive Works . The Class S-1a’s were built in 1926. The first batch of 25 were built by Lima, and numbered 6175-6199. The second batch was built by Baldwin, and numbered 6200-6224. They were nicknamed "big sixes" because until renumbering in 1954 their road numbers all began with 6. Locomotives numbered 6009 and 6030 were scrapped in 1925, and their boilers used to build new Class T 4-8-2 Mountain Type locomotives numbered 5500 & 5501. 15 of the Class were retired and scrapped in 1938. The remainder of S-1's/S-1a's continued service until 1953-1959.

None of the B&O Class S 2-10-2’s were preserved.

S
2-10-2 locomotives
Baldwin locomotives
Lima locomotives
Railway locomotives introduced in 1914
Steam locomotives of the United States
Scrapped locomotives
Freight locomotives
Standard gauge locomotives of the United States